Wester Aberchalder is a small village, situated on the south shore of Loch Mhòr, lying on the Aberchalder Burn, which flows into the loch,  in Gorthleck,  Inverness-shire, Scottish Highlands and is in the Scottish council area of Highland. The village of Easter Aberchalder lies approximately one mile to the 0.5 miles to the east.

References

Populated places in Inverness committee area